The Mercedes-Benz SLS AMG (C197 / R197) is a front mid-engine, 2-seater, limited production grand tourer developed by the Mercedes-AMG division of German automotive manufacturer Mercedes-Benz, with the assistance of David Coulthard. The car is the successor to the Mercedes-Benz SLR McLaren and was described by Mercedes-Benz as a spiritual successor to the Mercedes-Benz 300SL Gullwing, mainly because it was inspired by the latter. SLS stands for "Super Leicht Sport" (Super Light Sport).

The SLS was the first Mercedes-Benz automobile designed and built from scratch entirely by AMG. Upon its introduction at the 2009 Frankfurt Motor Show, the SLS AMG's  M159 engine was according to AMG "the world's most powerful naturally aspirated production series engine" ever produced.

An electric version of the car, the SLS AMG Electric Drive, was presented at the 2012 Paris Motor Show. Production ended in 2014 with the introduction of the SLS AMG GT Final Edition.

As compared to its predecessor (the Mercedes-McLaren SLR), the SLS is per Mercedes-AMG head Tobias Moers, the faster car on the track, both in the hands of normal drivers as well as race car drivers. The SLS, however, has a curb weight of  when equipped with the standard wheels.

Design

The SLS AMG was designed  by Mark Fetherston to be a modern 300SL Gullwing revival from October 2006 to April 2007. In case of a roll-over, the doors can be fully detached to allow the occupants to leave the vehicle.

Although there is some overlapping in price and performance, the lighter SLS AMG is considered more of a sporty track-oriented car, compared to the Mercedes-Benz SL which is a grand tourer especially with its optional V12 engine. Compared to the SLS AMG Roadster, the SL is a hardtop convertible with technological and comfort amenities, and it also has available heated seats with a massage function.

The SLS AMG has won a number of design awards, including the 2010 red dot "best of the best" award, the iF product design award 2010 for the "Transportation Design" category, and the Auto Bild Design Award 2010 as "Europe's most attractive car". It is also the only automobile to have won the gold Design Award of the Federal Republic of Germany.

Production and sales

Body styles (production years)

The SLS AMG was assembled largely by hand, with its chassis and aluminum body shell produced by Magna Steyr in Graz, Austria and then transferred to Sindelfingen, Germany for assembly, with its engine being hand built by AMG in Affalterbach, Germany.

The SLS AMG was officially introduced at the 2009 Frankfurt Motor Show, and sales commenced in mid-2010 in Europe and in mid-2011 in the United States.

Specifications

Engine 

The 6.2-litre V8 engine (based on the M156 block) was modified to such an extent that AMG gave it a separate engine code—M159—to signify the more than 120 different modifications done to the engine (as well as the addition of a dry-sump lubrication system to handle the car's high cornering speeds).

Transmission 

AMG SPEEDSHIFT DCT 7-speed dual-clutch automatic is connected to the engine through a lightweight carbon fibre driveshaft in a transaxle arrangement. Selectable driving modes include "C" (Controlled Efficiency), "S" (Sport), "S+" (Sport plus) or "M" (Manual; allowing the driver to change gears via paddles present on the steering column behind the steering wheel). A true manual transmission is not available. All SLS AMG models except the SLS AMG Electric Drive use the DCT, with the Electric Drive using two single speed transmissions allowing individual distribution of torque to each wheel.

Brakes 

Optional on the SLS AMG are carbon-ceramic disc brakes.  discs with 6-piston aluminium calipers (front) and  discs with 4-piston calipers (rear). These brakes provide increased stopping power with a 40% weight reduction compared to the standard braking system.

Fuel consumption 
The fuel consumption of the SLS AMG is around  combined driving (NEDC, provisional figure).

Performance 
The SLS AMG achieves a lateral acceleration of 0.99, improving upon the Mercedes-Benz SLR McLaren, which achieves a 0.97 figure.

Safety 
In the June 2010 issue of Car and Driver magazine, safety specifications were revealed pertaining to the safety of the SLS AMG's gullwing doors. Ten to fifteen milliseconds after a detected rollover, explosive bolts situated at the top of the door frame fire and bell cranks separate the doors from the car for easy exit during a serious accident. An anti-lock braking system and a 3-stage electronic stability program (ESP) are standard equipment.

Exterior 

The exterior aluminum body is supplied by Magna Steyr. The SLS and the CL65 AMG 40th Anniversary Edition are the only roadgoing Mercedes-Benz automobiles with the AMG Alubeam Silver exterior paint available, at an extra cost of €11,900 in Germany. Other colours include both metallic and matte colours, such as Designo Magno Kashmir, the matte paint known from the SL63 AMG IWC edition.

Models 

The first model introduced in the SLS lineage was the coupé with gullwing doors.

SLS AMG Coupé (2009)

The initial introduction took place at the 2009 Frankfurt Motor Show, and later at the 2009 Tokyo Game Show, Auto China 2010, and the second terminal of the Haneda Airport. The production model went on sale in spring 2010. Commercial release of the German model began on 16 November 2009. Pre-orders of the Japanese model began on 14 April 2010 with sales beginning from 10 June 2010 and deliveries beginning on 28 September 2010. Various minor changes and variations ensued, as identified below, with a very small gain in horsepower (though the torque remained identical) and in the case of the final edition in model year 2015, certain visual add-ons (a fixed spoiler and carbon-effect).

SLS AMG "AMG Desert Gold" (2010)

Unveiled at the 2010 Dubai International Motor Show, this variant of the SLS AMG Coupé showcased further customisation options for the SLS AMG including decorative features in shining chrome or Silver Shadow colours, black-painted AMG light-alloy wheels in size 9.5 x 19 at the front and 11.0 x 20 at the rear with a golden ring on the rim flange and a matte gold body colour dubbed "desert gold".

SLS AMG "Blackbird" (2010)

Ordered by Mercedes-Benz's Australian subsidiary for the Australian International Motor Show, the Blackbird is a one-off variant of the 2010 Mercedes-Benz SLS AMG Coupé with designo magno Night Black body colour with red highlights.

SLS AMG E-CELL prototype (2011)

The battery is a 400 Volt lithium unit with a capacity of 48 kWh. Other features include pushrod damper struts, 402 x 39 mm (front) and 360 x 32 mm (rear) carbon ceramic brake discs. Full-LED headlamps, AMG 10-spoke light-alloy wheels with smooth-surfaced design, 265/35 R 19 (front) and 295/30 R 20 (rear) tyres, AMG Drive Unit angled towards the driver, sports seats made of quality Nappa leather in a black/white colour combination, performance leather/Alcantara steering wheel and the door linings, centre tunnel.

The battery was manufactured by Deutsche Accumotive GmbH & Co. KG, a joint venture between Daimler AG and Evonik Industries AG. The drivetrain has been in development since 2010 as a result of the cooperation between Mercedes-AMG and Mercedes AMG High Performance Powertrains in Brixworth.

SLS AMG GT3 (2011–2014)

The SLS AMG GT3 is a race version of the SLS AMG Coupé, developed in accordance with the GT3 regulations of the FIA (Fédération Internationale de l'Automobile). Notable changes include a sequential six-speed racing transmission with shift paddles mounted on the steering column, an integrated multi-disc locking differential and traction control, adjustment facilities for the springs and shock absorbers; the suspension height, the stabilisers, the track width and camber; a rack-and-pinion steering with a more direct ratio and servo assistance, AMG 18-inch light-alloy wheels, a steel racing braking system with racing ABS, seat shell (individually foam-padded, featuring the HANS (Head And Neck Support) system located in a high-strength carbon-fibre (CFRP) safety cell, a six-point racing harness, an optimised fire extinguisher system and the central display positioned within the driver's field of vision. The Development of the new Mercedes-Benz SLS AMG GT3 testing programme began on Lausitz Eurospeedway in June 2010.

Official introduction took place at the 2010 New York International Auto Show followed by Puebla in Mexico, and the 2010 Pebble Beach Concours d'Elegance. Deliveries began in February 2011, following homologation by the FIA in accordance with the GT3 regulations.

SLS AMG Roadster (2011–2014)

The roadster's DIN kerb weight is  more than the SLS AMG Coupé. Certain reinforcements were made to the roadster in order to compensate for the loss of roof which includes side skirts with greater wall thicknesses and more chambers, a dashboard cross-member is supported against the windscreen frame and centre tunnel by additional struts, a curved strut between the soft top and the tank reinforces the rear axle, a reinforcing cross-member behind the seats to support the fixed roll-over protection system. Other features include 265/35 ZR 19 front and 295/30 ZR 20 rear wheels, optional AMG Sepang brown body colour, optional weight-optimised forged wheels in a 10-spoke design in black with a high-sheen rim flange, optional AMG RIDE CONTROL sports suspension, 175 litres boot capacity, choice of 3 trims (leather, matte-finished solid metal, optional carbon-fibre), black designo leather upholstery, AMG sports seats with heating, a slot-in glass draught-stop, COMAND APS with DVD player, anti-theft alarm system with tow-away protection and interior monitoring, THERMOTRONIC luxury automatic climate control, KEYLESS-GO starting function, optional AIRSCARF ventilation at backrests of the AMG sports seats, leather-lined roll-over bars with integrated mesh in a "Silver Shadow" look with optional designo Exclusive leather, optional electrically folding exterior mirrors, optional Bang & Olufsen BeoSound AMG surround sound system, AMG Performance Media with high-speed mobile internet access (via Android operating system), optional Blind Spot Assist, optional AMG RIDE CONTROL sports suspension, 3-stage ESP with acceleration skid control, optional front AMG ceramic brake discs, AMG 7-spoke light-alloy wheels (optional 5-twin-spoke wheels, weight-optimised 10-spoke forged wheels), 265/35 R 19 front and 295/30 R 20 rear tyres, tyre pressure monitoring system.

The SLS AMG Roadster was unveiled at the 2011 Frankfurt International Motor Show.

Pre-orders began from 1 June 2011, with its market launch took place in Autumn 2011.

The Japanese model went on sale on 21 September 2011.

SLS AMG Ambulance (2011)
The SLS AMG Ambulance concept showcases  
the sports car as an emergency vehicle. Unveiled at the 2011 RETTmobil emergency vehicle expo, the concept retained the amenities of the standard car. The car was finished in ALU-BEAM silver metallic exterior colour with decals and emergency lights. It wasn't, however, revealed whether the car was fitted with specialised equipment.

SLS AMG Matte Black Edition (2011–2013)
It is a limited version of the SLS AMG Coupé for the Japanese market, commemorating the first year of Mercedes-Benz SLS AMG. It included designo magno Night Black body colour with red highlights at 3-pointed star, grill fin, bonnet fin, SLS/AMG rear emblems, fuel lid (from the Blackbird car); matte black exhaust tip, high gloss black interior trim, leather upholstery in classic red/black, AMG RIDE CONTROL sports suspension, AMG red brake calliper, 19-inch front and 20-inch rear AMG 10-spoke alloy wheels in matte black, AMG performance steering wheel in leather/Alcantara.

The vehicle went on sale in September.

SLS AMG Matte Edition (2012)
The SLS AMG Roadster Matte Black Edition is a limited (5 units) version of the left-drive SLS AMG Roadster for the Japanese market. Main highlights include designo magno Night Black body colour, classic red/black interior, black soft top, high gloss black interior trim, red paint metal parts (3-pointed star, grill fin, bonnet fin, fender fin, AMG rear/6.3 emblems, fuel lid), matte black exhaust tip, 19-inch front and 20-inch rear AMG 10-spoke alloy wheels in matte black with red rim, 2-tone leather upholstery, AMG performance steering wheel in leather/Alcantara, Performance Studio floor mat and the AMG RIDE CONTROL sports suspension.

The SLS AMG Coupé Matte White Edition and SLS AMG Roadster Matte White Edition are limited (10 Coupé, 5 Roadster) versions of the left-drive SLS AMG Coupé and SLS AMG Roadster respectively, for the Japanese market. It included designo magno Cashmere White body colour, porcelain/black interior, black soft top (Roadster only), high gloss black interior trim, matte black paint metal parts (3-pointed star, grill fin, bonnet fin, fender fin, AMG rear/6.3 emblems, fuel lid, door mirror cover), matte black exhaust tip, 19-inch front and 20-inch rear AMG 10-spoke alloy wheels in matte black in matte black, 2-tone leather upholstery, AMG performance steering wheel in leather/Alcantara, Performance Studio floor mat, AMG RIDE CONTROL sports suspension.

The models went on sale in May 2012, while deliveries of SLS AMG Roadster Matte Black Edition, SLS AMG Coupé Matte White Edition, SLS AMG Roadster Matte White Edition began in September 2012, October 2012 and October 2012 respectively.

SLS AMG GT (2012)

Other options include AMG carbon-fibre exterior mirrors, AMG carbon-fibre engine compartment cover, AMG Interior Carbon-Fibre package (carbon-fibre trim, trim on seat backrest and side, door sill panels), AMG ceramic high-performance composite braking system, AMG Performance Media, AMG 10-spoke forged wheels in various colours, AMG carbon-fibre exterior package, AIRSCARF (Roadster) and Bang & Olufsen BeoSound AMG surround sound system.

The SLS AMG GT completed a lap around the Nürburgring Nordschleife in under 7 minutes 30 seconds.

The market launch began in October 2012.

US models went on sale in mid- November 2012 as 2013 model year vehicles, replacing previous SLS AMG versions.

Japanese models went on sale on 30 November 2012, with deliveries starting in March 2013.

SLS AMG GT3 "45th ANNIVERSARY" (2012)
Unveiled at the 2012 São Paulo International Motor Show, the SLS AMG GT3 "45th ANNIVERSARY" is a limited (5 units) version of the SLS AMG GT3 commemorating the 45th anniversary of the AMG brand. Main highlights included designo magno graphite matte body colour, a seat shell in a high-strength carbon-fibre safety cell on the co-driver's side, carbon fibre reinforced plastic doors, bonnet, mudguards, boot lid, rear wings, front and rear apron, front splitter and rear diffuser.

The engines for the SLS AMG GT3 "45th ANNIVERSARY" were installed by Bernd Schneider.

SLS AMG Black Series (2013)

Unveiled at the 2012 LA Auto Show, with a market launch that began in June 2013. the SLS AMG Black Series is a high-performance variant of the SLS AMG Coupé inspired by the SLS AMG GT3. The Black Series engine was, at the time, the most powerful naturally aspirated V8 engine fitted into production cars, until the debut of the Chevrolet Corvette C8 Z06.

The Black Series is  lighter than the standard model. This is accomplished by increased use of carbon fibre in body panels, mechanical components, and the space frame.

The AMG SpeedShift DCT 7-speed sports transmission is installed  lower in order to achieve a lower centre of gravity for the car and is braced against the body by gas-filled struts in order to avoid stress cycles. The transmission's "Sport plus" and "Manual" modes have faster shifting speed than the standard model. The downshifting throttle blips are more audible. The new temporary "M" mode enables the driver to activate manual mode without having to remove a hand from the steering wheel, by pressing the "up" or "down" shift paddle once.

Optional AMG Aerodynamics package includes a fixed adjustable carbon-fibre rear aerofoil as installed on the SLS AMG GT3, rear aerofoil braced by aluminium elements on a special insert on the boot lid, additional carbon-fibre flics on the front apron. New body colour choices include AMG solar beam yellow (total 7, including matte paint designo magno alanite grey).

Other options include AMG carbon-fibre wing mirrors, AMG carbon-fibre engine cover, AMG Interior Carbon-Fibre package, AMG infotainment system (incl. COMAND APS, AMG Performance Media and backup camera), Media Interface.

The US model went on sale in summer 2013 as 2014 model year vehicle.

SLS AMG Electric Drive (2013)

The SLS AMG Electric Drive was a limited edition electric variant of the SLS AMG introduced in June 2013. The production version was unveiled at the 2012 Paris Motor Show, with market launch initially scheduled for June 2013. The production number has been officially confirmed: only nine SLS AMG Electric Drive were sold to the customers worldwide.

History
Following the introduction of the SLS AMG E-CELL prototype, the production of SLS AMG E-CELL was originally announced at the 2011 North American International Auto Show.

Powertrain 
Each motor can spin up to 13,000 rpm and weighs . In addition, the transmission allows each motor to selectively drive all 4 wheels.

Battery 
The SLS AMG Electric Drive included a liquid-cooled 400 V lithium-ion battery rated to 60 kWh that had a range of  under the combined New European Driving Cycle.  The  battery pack is made up of 12 modules, each comprising 72 lithium-ion cells.  The system was designed as a collaboration between Mercedes-AMG and Mercedes AMG High Performance Powertrains Ltd.

SLS AMG GT Final Edition (2014)

Available in both Coupé and Roadster body styles, the SLS AMG GT final edition is the final limited production iteration (350 units total, 25 in Japan) of the SLS AMG GT. Features includes an exposed carbon fibre hood with central air outlet, carbon fibre front splitter on the front apron, fixed carbon fiber rear spoiler from the SLS AMG Coupé Black Series, the choice of 2 exclusive AMG forged light-alloy wheels (inlaid in matte black with the spokes and rim flange in a high-sheen finish, completely painted matte black highlighted by a pencil thin high-sheen rim flange), designo magno graphite matte body colour (from the SLS AMG GT3 "45th ANNIVERSARY"), struts of the rear apron in high-gloss black, red-painted brake callipers, 265/35 R 19 (front) and 295/30 R 20 (rear) Dunlop Sport Maxx Race Cup tires as a no-cost option, designo Exclusive leather upholstery in a diamond-stitch pattern at centre panels of both the seats and the doors, contrasting topstitching in silver with black leather upholstery, silver seat belts, black floor mats edged in silver leather, high gloss carbon fiber trim, "AMG FINAL EDITION – 1 of 350" badge on the carbon fibre centre console, 3D seam (a fine strip of Alcantara) set into the leather-covered upper dashboard, contrasting topstitching in silver at 3D seam, AMG Performance steering wheel in Alcantara with a silver 12 o'clock marking and black metal inserts, high-gloss black surrounds of the air vents, sports seats with an embossed AMG crest in the head restraints.

The "Final Edition" changes do not result in any quantifiable performance difference over the prior year model. Horsepower, torque, acceleration times and top speed are all identical.

Other options include Carbon Fibre wing mirrors, Extended Interior Carbon Fibre package (additional carbon-fiber trim on seat backrest and side, as well as door sill panels), AMG Carbon-Ceramic High-Performance braking system, AMG Performance Media and Bang & Olufsen BeoSound AMG surround sound system.

The car was unveiled first at the 2013 Los Angeles Auto Show and the 2013 Tokyo Motor Show, followed by the 2013 Osaka Motor Show.

Market launch was set to begin in March 2014.

The Japan model was set to be delivered in June 2014, which included 20 Coupés, 5 Roadsters, the choice of 6 body colours (Fire Opal solid, Obsidian Black metallic, Elysium Silver metallic, AMG Imola Grey (premium), designo Magno Graphite (matte) (premium), designo Mystic White 2 (premium)), black designo Nappa full leather interior upholstery with silver diamond pattern stitching at door centre panel, seat centre; anthracite roof liner, choice of 3 soft top colours for Roadster (black, beige, red), carbon fibre wing mirrors, Bang & Olufsen BeoSound AMG sound system and optional AMG Carbon-Ceramic brake discs.

Motorsport

F1 Safety Car

SLS AMG E-CELL 
The SLS AMG E-CELL competed in the Paul Pietsch Classic 2011 under the 'Classic meets Future' category.

The SLS AMG E-CELL competed in the 2011 Silvretta electric car race that took place in the Montafon region of Austria.

SLS AMG GT3 (2011–2015)

SLS AMG GT3 first competed in the 2010 VLN Nürburgring Endurance Championship.

Since its launch in 2010, the SLS AMG GT3 has been competing in GT competitions around the world, such as the FIA GT3 European Championship, Blancpain Endurance Series, Blancpain Sprint Series, VLN, 24 Hours of Nürburgring, British GT Championship, Super GT, Australian GT Championship, Bathurst 12 Hour, Dubai 24 Hour, Macau GT Cup and Pirelli World Challenge. Also, the SLS AMG GT3 is used in the AMG Driving Academy programme.

The car won the 2012 and 2013 Dubai 24 Hour under Black Falcon Racing.

Erebus Racing has raced it in the Australian GT Championship, driven by Peter Hackett who is also the Chief Instructor at the Australian Mercedes Benz Driving Academy.

The SLS AMG GT3 competed in the Goodwood Festival of Speed 2011.

Black Swan Racing and DragonSpeed currently uses the SLS AMG GT3 in the SCCA Pirelli World Challenge.

An SLS took part in the 2012 Super GT season, with drivers Haruki Kurosawa and Hironori Takeuchi coming joint 5th in the GT300 drivers' championship. Five cars competed in the 2013 season.

An SLS won the 2013 Liqui Moly Bathurst 12 Hour, entered by Erebus Motorsport.

An SLS set the fastest lap, and won the 2013 24 Hours of Spa, taking the first Mercedes win in the race since 1964.

A total of 86 cars were sold.

Marketing
Mercedes-Benz SLS AMG branded shoes were produced and sold in collaboration with Italian designer Santoni.

As part of the SLS AMG's market launch, a print ad (started in February 2010) featured a red Mercedes-Benz SLS AMG striking a powerful pose on grey asphalt against a black backdrop. The visual motif is supported by a brief, meaningful message, such as "Oh Lord …" or "A cockpit. An engine. Two wings. Is it still a car?", for example. The print ad appeared in daily newspapers and magazines. A TV advert with Michael Schumacher telling the story of an experiment with the SLS AMG demonstrating its technical highlights from preparation and test phases to the realisation was produced. The TV ad was premiered on 30 January 2010 on all major television channels with a 60-second roadblock, followed by a 45-second version in reruns until the end of March. The Mercedes-Benz SLS AMG website was extended with the addition of an interactive guided tour of the AMG development plant. In addition, three editions of an online magazine provided extensive information on the performance ("Milliseconds"), the lightweight construction ("Milligrams") and the design ("Millimetres") of the SLS AMG. A reporter blog www.sls-amg-reporter.de was launched featuring fictional enthusiast Matthew K. posting reports, pictures and video clips of his travels as an SLS AMG reporter as he follows the global launch of the new gullwing. Starting at February 2010, a new iPhone application called "SLS AMG" was launched, featuring a preview of the car via 360° gameplay using the iPhone's accelerometer. SLS AMG also appeared in Gran Turismo 5, scheduled for release in 2010.

The Cigarette 46' Rider, a boat inspired by the SLS AMG and built by Cigarette Racing, was unveiled in 2010 at the Miami International Boat Show.

In 2011, the SLS was featured on the 16th series of Top Gear. The 2013 SLS Roadster was then reviewed two years later.

As part of the SLS AMG Roadster launch in the UK, a video featuring David Coulthard catching a speeding golf ball hit by professional golfer Jake Shepherd with a Mercedes-Benz SLS AMG Roadster was produced, and was independently verified by a Guinness World Record adjudicator as title of farthest golf shot caught in a moving car.

Minichamps produced a limited (197 units) edition of SLS AMG GT3 1:18 scale model car for the IAA 2013. The vehicle includes 88 parts, painted in matt black and features poison green details.

As part of its US marketing, the SLS AMG was also used at the 2009 AMG Driving Academy season for its Stage 1.

Production
Production of the SLS AMG began at Sindelfingen in January 2010. Sales commenced in mid-2010 in Europe and in mid-2011 in the United States. Production ended with the SLS AMG GT Final Edition in early 2014. A total of 2,734 SLS AMGs were sold in the U.S., including both Gullwings and roadsters.  According to a post on mbworld.org by a Mercedes-Benz executive, total U.S. sales of SLS AMGs several months earlier were as follows: 1,837 coupés and 884 roadsters.

The production breakdown for the 2014 SLS Black Series Coupe in the USA:

 132 – total vehicles, of which:
 39 (-197 Obsidian Black)
 32 (-048 designo Mystic White)
 30 (-278 Solarbeam Yellow)
 10 (-756 Imola Grey)
 7 (-775 Iridium Silver)
 7 (-044 Magno Alanite Grey)
 5 (-590 Mars Red)
 1 (-494 LeMans Red (pre-production car that was built before 494 was cancelled on the SLS platform))
 1 (-777 Silver Arrow (one-off car made for internal purposes))

Successor
The SLS AMG was followed in 2014 by the substantially less expensive, and less powerful, Mercedes-AMG GT. Designed to compete against the Porsche 911, it relies on forced induction for its power and is available as a  GT and  GT S.Moers was also quoted as follows: "Speaking to Autocar at the (2015) Geneva Motor Show, Mercedes-AMG boss Tobias Moers confirmed that the company has no plans to create a new supercar to replace the SLS.  According to Moers, Mercedes is 'not in that league' at this moment in time."

In popular culture
The SLS AMG was developed with the assistance of David Coulthard.  In his review for Top Gear, Jeremy Clarkson praised the SLS AMG highly, saying it is "the greatest car in the world," noting that "it's more powerful than a Ferrari 458, louder than a Lamborghini, and it's way more fun than the 911RS GT Turbo 3S or whatever this week's ultimate Beetle (i.e., Porsche) is called. This is the thinking man's supercar."

The car was also used as the disguise for Soundwave in Transformers: Dark of the Moon.

See also
 Mercedes-Benz 300SL
 Mercedes-Benz 300 SLR
 Mercedes-Benz SLR McLaren
 Mercedes-AMG GT

References

External links

SLS AMG at Mercedes-AMG's US website
Press kit:
The new Mercedes-Benz SLS AMG
The interior of the Mercedes-Benz SLS AMG
The Mercedes-Benz SLS AMG Roadster: Perfect roadster performance
The new Mercedes-Benz SLS AMG GT3

Grand tourers
Coupés
Flagship vehicles
SLS
Automobiles with gull-wing doors
Retro-style automobiles
Cars introduced in 2010
Front mid-engine, rear-wheel-drive vehicles
Electric vehicles